Fulham Fire Station is a Grade II listed building at 685 Fulham Road, Fulham, London.

It was built from 1895 to 1896, and the chief architect was Robert Pearsall. In 1994, it was refurbished and extended by the Welling Partnership.

References

Grade II listed buildings in the London Borough of Hammersmith and Fulham
Grade II listed government buildings
Fire stations completed in 1896
Fire stations in the United Kingdom
Buildings by Robert Pearsall
Fulham